Valentino Returns is a 1989 American romantic drama film written by Leonard Gardner, directed by Peter Hoffman and starring Frederic Forrest, Veronica Cartwright, Jenny Wright and Barry Tubb.  It is Hoffman's feature directorial debut and based on Gardner's short story "Christ Has Returned to Earth and Preaches Here Nightly."

Cast
Frederic Forrest as Sonny Gibbs
Veronica Cartwright as Patricia 'Pat' Gibbs
Barry Tubb as Wayne Gibbs
Jenny Wright as Sylvia Fuller
Leonard Gardner as Lyle
David Packer as Messner
Seth Isler as Harry Ames

Production
The movie was filmed in and around Stockton, and was funded by its director Peter Hoffman. It found an advocate in John Pierson, who recommended it for inclusion in the 1988 Sundance Film Festival. However, in his book Spike, Mike, Slackers, & Dykes, Pierson explains that Hoffman couldn't finish post-production on time:

Release
The film was released at the 68th Street Playhouse in New York City on July 21, 1989.

References

External links
 
 

American romantic drama films
1989 directorial debut films